Assortment may refer to:

 Assortment (assortiment, the parts of a clockwork movement other than the ébauche
 Assortment (album), by Atomic Rooster, 1973

See also

 Law of independent assortment in genetics
 Retail assortment strategies